Lia (born December 20; also stylized in all caps as LIA) is a Japanese singer and songwriter. Lia recorded "Tori no Uta" for Key's 2000 visual novel Air, which was reused in its 2005 anime adaptation and became influential in popular culture. She additionally recorded two other tracks for the visual novel, which were commercially successful. 

Lia has continued to work with Key by performing songs for their 2004 visual novel Clannad and its 2008 anime adaptation, Clannad After Story, the 2005 adult visual novel Tomoyo After: It's a Wonderful Life, as well as the opening themes for Key's original anime series Angel Beats! in 2010 and Charlotte in 2015. Her other songs used in anime include RF Online and Initial D Fourth Stage.

In 2012, the Vocaloid software IA was released, which sampled Lia's voice and earned a large fanbase.

Career 
Lia graduated from the Berklee College of Music. Afterwards, she lived in Los Angeles and recorded demo tapes with the help of a friend. Originally asked to help translate between the recording staff and the studio, Visual Arts asked Lia if she could fill in for an absent vocalist. Lia recorded her first song "Tori no Uta" at Paramount Studio.

Lia was a member of Japanese techno/trance music production group I've Sound from 2001 to 2003, where she performed "Disintegration" in the Disintegration compilation album. She signed with Key Sounds Label in 2001, and Pony Canyon in 2004. Lia produced four albums in the happy hardcore genre; these albums have her name in all capital letters.

Lia performed the opening and ending themes of two of Key's visual novels—Air and Tomoyo After: It's a Wonderful Life—as well as the opening themes for Key's two original anime series—Angel Beats! and Charlotte. She performed the theme song for the MMORPG RF Online entitled "The Force of Love". Lia has also performed some Eurobeat songs for the anime series Initial D Fourth Stage entitled "All Around" and "Sky High" under the Avex Trax label. To celebrate her 20th anniversary as an artist, she released a compilation album titled Lia 20th Best on November 25, 2020.

Personal life 
Lia is fluent in English and Japanese. On July 1, 2009, Lia announced on her blog that she was married and pregnant. She gave birth to a daughter on January 31, 2010. She has been living in Hong Kong since 2014.

Discography

Singles 
"Natsukage / Nostalgia" (December 24, 2001)
"Shift: Sedai no Mukō" (December 29, 2001)
"I'm Feeling" (July 1, 2003) – Analog single
"Birthday Song, Requiem" (June 25, 2004)
"Spica/Hanabi/Moon" (June 25, 2004)
"Kimi no Yoin: Tōi no Sora no Shita de" (March 24, 2005)
"Tori no Uta / Farewell Song" (May 23, 2006) – Analog single
Opening/ending themes of Air
"Pride: Try to Fight!" (June 21, 2006)
The title song was used as an ending theme of Crash B-Daman
"Over the Future" (November 22, 2006)
"Over the Future" was used as an ending theme of Crash B-Daman
"Doll / Human" (January 30, 2008) – Single with Aoi Tada #54 on Oricon
"Doll" and "Human" were used as ending themes for Gunslinger Girl -Il Teatrino-
"Toki o Kizamu Uta / Torch" (November 14, 2008) #13 on Oricon
Opening/ending themes of the Clannad After Story anime series
"My Soul, Your Beats! / Brave Song" (May 26, 2010) – Single with Aoi Tada #3 on Oricon
Performed "My Soul, Your Beats!", which was used as the opening theme to the Angel Beats! anime series
"Ashita Tenki ni Naare" (July 21, 2010)
Title song was used as the first ending theme for Daimajin Kanon and "Aruite Kaerō" was used for the second ending theme
"Kizunairo" (October 27, 2010) #6 on Oricon
Opening theme for the Fortune Arterial anime series
"Justitia"
Opening theme for the Wizard Barristers anime series
"Daze / Days" (June 18, 2014)
Performed "Days", which was used as the ending theme for the Mekakucity Actors anime series
"Heartily Song" (April 1, 2015)
Opening theme for the Angel Beats! -1st beat- visual novel
"Bravely You / Yakeochinai Tsubasa" (August 26, 2015) – Single with Aoi Tada #4 on Oricon
Performed "Bravely You", which was used as the opening theme to the Charlotte anime series

Albums

Original albums 
Prismatic, Released June 25, 2004
Colors of life, Released May 25, 2005
Gift, Released December 29, 2005
Dearly, Released November 1, 2006
Collection Album Vol.1 [Diamond Days], Released September 19, 2007
Collection Album Vol.2 [Crystal Voice], Released October 17, 2007
New Moon, Released September 2, 2008
Key+Lia Best 2001–2010, Released June 24, 2011

Happy hardcore albums 
enigmatic LIA, Released September 22, 2005
enigmatic LIA 2, Released February 16, 2007
Collection Album [Spectrum Rays], Released October 17, 2007
enigmatic LIA 3 -worldwide collection-, Released April 1, 2009
enigmatic LIA 4 -Anthemical Keyworlds- & -Anthemnia L's core-, Released June 22, 2011

Other songs 
"Akai Yakusoku" (Fortune Arterial visual novel ending theme)
"Aozora" (Air insert song)
"All Around" / "Sky High" (Initial D 4th Stage insert songs)
"Ana" (Clannad insert song)
"Yakusoku" (Clannad film image song)
"Light colors" (Opening theme of Tomoyo After: It's a Wonderful Life)
"Life is like a Melody" (Ending theme of Tomoyo After)
"Last regrets -acoustic version-" (featured on the Kanon arrange album Recollections)
"The Force of Love" (Theme song for MMORPG RF Online)
"Girls Can Rock" / "Feel Like A Girl" (School Rumble: Second Term insert songs)
"Horizon" (featured in Beatmania IIDX 11: IIDX RED, produced by Kosuke Saito aka kors k)
"Saya's Song" (Little Busters! Ecstasy insert song)
"Tazunebito" (Hoshiuta opening theme)
"Hoshikuzu no Kizuna" (Hoshiuta: Starlight Serenade opening theme)
"Mado Kara Mieru" (Calling All Dawns)
"Asu ni Mukatte, Get Dream!" (Crash B-Daman first ending theme)
"I scream Chocolatl" (Team Nekokan feat. Lia, Kokoro Connect fourth ending theme)

References

External links 
 

Anime musicians
Avex Group artists
Living people
New-age musicians
Singers from Tokyo
21st-century Japanese singers
Year of birth missing (living people)
21st-century Japanese women singers
Japanese expatriates in Hong Kong